Peto, Brassey and Betts was a civil engineering partnership between Samuel Morton Peto, Thomas Brassey and Edward Betts. They built a supply and casualty transport railway (Grand Crimean Central Railway) from Balaclava port to the siege lines southeast of Sevastopol in 1855 during the Crimean War. The supply line was instrumental in the success of the siege. The partnership was contracted to produce a number of significant projects around the world including Victoria Bridge in Montreal and the European and North American Railway.

Significant works 
 1854: London, Tilbury and Southend Railway
 1855: Grand Crimean Central Railway for the British Army
 1859: Victoria Bridge, Montreal, Canada
 1865–1867: Main Range Railway in Queensland, Australia

Gallery

References

Further reading 
  — available online at the Open Library

External links 

Construction and civil engineering companies of the United Kingdom
Construction and civil engineering companies established in 1855
British companies established in 1855